Renata Kijowska (born December 10, 1975) is a Polish journalist and reporter of The Facts, the flagship newscast of TVN, one of Poland's major television networks.

Biography

She studied political science and journalism at the Jagiellonian University in Kraków. Renata Kijowska began her career in TVP, she co-operated with television newscast Kronika (TVP Kraków). She was also a journalist of TV Puls and Radio Plus.

Renata Kijowska wrote in Tygodnik Powszechny, a Polish Roman Catholic weekly magazine, focusing on social and cultural issues.

References

Polish television journalists
Polish radio journalists
Polish radio presenters
Polish women radio presenters
Living people
1975 births